Ismael Saz Campos (born 1952) is a Spanish historian, specialised in the study of Falangism, Francoist Spain and the Spanish-Italian relations during the Spanish Civil War. He is a professor at the University of Valencia.

Biography 
Born in 1952 in Valencia. He earned a PhD at the University of Valencia (UV) in 1986. His dissertation dealt with the understanding of the Italian-Spanish relations until the Italian intervention in the Spanish Civil War.

Saz, who has conceptualised the Francoist regime as a "fascistised dictatorship", has posed in his work the struggle between Fascist and national-catholic nationalisms within the regime. Full professor of the UV, he was appointed to a Chair of Contemporary History in 2002.

Works 

Author
 
 
 
 
Editor/Coordinator

References 
Citations

Bibliography
 
 
 
 
 
 
 
 
 

20th-century Spanish historians
Academic staff of the University of Valencia
1952 births
Historians of fascism
Living people
21st-century Spanish historians